The Indian locomotive class WAG-6B/C is a class of 25 kV AC electric locomotives that was developed in the 1988 by Hitachi for Indian Railways. The model name stands for broad gauge (W), AC Current (A), Goods (G) engine, 6th generation (6) Second/Third variant (B/C). They entered service in 1988. A total of 12 WAG-6 (6 B variant and 6 C variant) were built at Hitachi, Japan between 1987 and 1988. they along with WAG-6A were the most powerful locomotives in India until the arrival of the WAG-9 class.

Some of the locomotives are still in service for shunting and departmental duties with 1 unit from each variant earmarked for preservation.

History 
The history of WAG-6A begins in early 1980s with the aim of addressing the shortcomings of the previous WAG-1, WAG-2, WAG-3, WAG-4 and WAG-5 classes and remove steam locomotives from IR by a target date of 1990. The WAG-5 were a great successes but these locomotives were based on 1960s technology and fast became underpowered for the expanding Indian railways. So Indian Railways decided to look for a new locomotive. At that time (1980s) Thyristor controller was vastly used by locomotive in many European rail networks while 3 Phase AC technology was still in its infancy. So the ministry of railways floated a tender for a 6000HP locomotive with Thyristor control. The following responses were received:

 Hitachi submitted their model with 6000 hp with Bo-Bo-Bo bogies and Thyristor chopper control
 Hitachi also submitted their model with 6000 hp with Co-Co- bogies and Thyristor chopper control
 ASEA submitted their model with 6000 hp with Bo-Bo-Bo bogies and Thyristor chopper control.

Each company submitted their prototypes and Indian Railways designated these prototypes as the WAG-6B class WAG-6C class and WAG-6A class respectively. IR ordered 6 of each class and these were delivered in 1988.

Specification( WAG 6B, WAG 6C ) 
Builder: Hitachi
 Build dates:
 WAG 6B, 1988
 WAG 6C, 1988
 Wheel arrangement:
 WAG 6B, Bo-Bo-Bo
 WAG 6C, Co-Co
 Traction Motors:
(WAG-6B) Hitachi HS 15556-OIR, bogie mounted, force-ventilated, compound-wound, 3200 kg
(WAG-6C) Hitachi HS 15256-UIR, axle-hung nose-suspended, force-ventilated, compound-wound, 3650 kg.
 Transformer: (WAG-6B/C) Hitachi AFIC-MS, 6325 kVA.
 Thyristor controller:(WAG-6B/C) 32 CGOIDA thyristors each with 24 DSP2500A diodes. 2x720 A, 850 V.
 Pantographs: (WAG-6B/C) Two Faiveley LV2600

Locomotive shed

See also 

 Indian Railways
 Rail transport in India#History
 Locomotives of India
 Rail transport in India

References

External links 

 Specifications
 India railway fan club
 IR WAG-6 @ Trainspo
 IT Locomotive Numbers

5 ft 6 in gauge locomotives
25 kV AC locomotives
Bo-Bo-Bo locomotives
Co-Co locomotives
Electric locomotives of India
Railway locomotives introduced in 1988
Hitachi locomotives